Nadia Boudesoque de Haro Oliva (11 April 1918 – 17 January 2014), born Albertina Charlotte Boudesoque Noblecourt, was a French-Mexican fencer and actress. She competed in the women's individual foil event at the 1948 Summer Olympics.

Select filmography
 The Exterminating Angel (1962)
 Love in the Shadows (1960)
 Mysteries of Black Magic (1958)
 Where the Circle Ends (1956)

References

External links

 

1918 births
2014 deaths
Mexican film actresses
Mexican female foil fencers
French emigrants to Mexico
Olympic fencers of Mexico
Fencers at the 1948 Summer Olympics